Events from the year 1847 in art.

Events
Salon indépendent established in Paris.
William Dyce is commissioned to decorate the Queen's Robing Room at the newly completed Palace of Westminster.

Works

John Wilson Carmichael – HMS Erebus and Terror in the Antarctic
Thomas Cole – Indian Pass Tawahus
Thomas Couture – Romans of the Decadence
Jean-Léon Gérôme – The Cock Fight
Solomon Hart – Milton Visiting Galileo when a Prisoner of the Inquisition
John Rogers Herbert – Our Saviour Subject to His Parents in Nazareth
Edward Hicks – Penn's Treaty
Robert Huskisson – The Midsummer Night's Fairies
Charles Lees – The Golfers
Theodor Sockl – Clara Adelheid Soterius von Sachsenheim
Antoine Wiertz – Deux jeunes filles (La Belle Rosine)
Alexandre Cabanel – The Fallen Angel

Births
January 15 – Camille Doncieux, French artists' model, first wife of Monet (died 1879)
February 10 – Anne de Rochechouart de Mortemart, French patron and sculptor (died 1933) 
March 1 - Thomas Brock, English sculptor and medallist (died 1922)
March 19 – Albert Pinkham Ryder, American painter (died 1917)
April 1 – Hamilton Hamilton, English-born American painter (died 1928)
April 16 – Ellen Thayer Fisher, American botanical painter (died 1911)
July 20 – Max Liebermann, German painter (died 1935)
September 10 – Kobayashi Kiyochika, Japanese painter and printmaker (died 1915)
September 11 – T. C. Steele, American painter (died 1926)
October 6 – Adolf von Hildebrand, German sculptor (died 1921)
October 15 – Ralph Albert Blakelock, American painter (died 1919)
October 20 - Frits Thaulow, Norwegian painter (died 1906)
November 10 – Frederick Arthur Bridgman, American painter (died 1928)
date unknown – Vladislav Titelbah, Serbian painter (died 1925).

Deaths
 January 1 – William Derby, English miniature painter and copyist (born 1786)
 January 4 – Alexey Venetsianov, Russian painter especially of peasant life and ordinary people (born 1780)
 January 16 – Michael Sigismund Frank, German glass painter (born 1770)
 February – Sampson Towgood Roch, Irish painter of miniatures (born 1757)
 February 17 – William Collins, English painter (born 1788)
 March 17 – Jean Ignace Isidore Gérard Grandville (J. J. Grandville), French caricaturist (born 1803)
 May 28 – Henry Hoppner Meyer, English portrait painter and engraver (born 1780)
 June 9 – Joachim Christian Reinhart, German painter and etcher (born 1761)
 July 1 – Georg Friedrich Kersting, German painter of Biedermeier-style interior paintings (born 1785)
 August 17 – Thomas Griffiths Wainewright, English-born painter, art critic, forger and probable serial poisoner (born 1794)
 August 29 – William Simson, Scottish-born painter (born 1799)
 September 15 – Jan Mooy, Dutch marine art painter (born 1776)
 September 28 – Johann Michael Sattler, Austrian portrait and landscape painter (born 1786)
 December 11 – Thomas Barker, British painter of landscape and rural life (born 1769)
 December 29 – William Crotch, English musician and painter (born 1775)
 date unknown
 Élise Bruyère, French painter specializing in portraits and floral still life (born 1776)
 Amelia Curran, Irish painter (born 1775)
 Ferdinand Wolfgang Flachenecker, German painter (born 1792)
 Guillaume-Joseph Roques, French painter (born 1757)
 approximate date – Sin Wi, Korean painter in the literary artist's style of the late Joseon period (born 1769)

References

 
Years of the 19th century in art
1840s in art
1847 in the arts